Klaus Thymann (born 1974) is a Danish explorer, scientist, fellow at the Royal Geographical Society, multi award-winning photographer, filmmaker and creative director based in London, United Kingdom. He has developed an original viewpoint utilising a cross-disciplinary skillset that combines journalism, image making, mapping, documentary and exploration with a focus on contemporary issues and the climate emergency. Thymann reports on environmental issues from all around the world and has been featured by BBC, National Geographic, The Guardian, New Scientist and many other distinguished media outlets. He was awarded with the Sony World Photography Award in 2013 and was the youngest winner of the Scandinavian Kodak Gold Award in 1996.

Early life and education
Thymann was born in 1974 in Copenhagen, Denmark. In 1988, at the age of fourteen, he began working as a photographer, photographing tourists for the Canal Tours. For the next few years, he also worked as a photographer and writer for several Danish publications. He attended Marie Kruses Skole in Farum, Denmark where he graduated in 1993. In 1996, Thymann was the recipient of the Scandinavian Kodak Gold Award. He received a Bachelor of Science degree in Environmental studies from The Open University (UK) in 2015.

Career
Thymann started his professional career in 1997 after co-founding a biannual magazine, Virus. The magazine was first to publish a feature on ECHELON, a surveillance program operated by the United States. The feature opened up the way for an investigation by a committee of the European Parliament during 2000 and 2001 with a report published in 2001.

In 1999, Thymann collaborated with the Danish alternative rock band Kashmir to create the music video of the songs in the album The Good Life. He was awarded with the 2000 Danish Music Awards in the Danish Music Video of the Year category for the video to the track "Mom in Love & Daddy in Space".

Since the early 2000s, Thymann has led several photography projects and expedition all around the globe. His expeditions have taken him to the mountain-tops, glaciers as well as underwater. Throughout his practice, Thymann reveals an interest in the act of exploring and mapping – both in a physical sense and in a more conceptual manner. He has conducted the only scuba dive of the world's clearest lake in New Zealand, documented tourism in Iraq, parkour in Gaza, the relocation of the Arctic town Kiruna In Sweden and explored the glaciers of Uganda and Congo via new trekking routes. He is continuously launching expeditions and has led teams to mountains on six continents summiting peaks above 6300m.

In 2008 he combined his diverse talents to establish the charity Project Pressure – Visualizing the Climate Crisis. The charity uses art as a positive touch-point to inspire action and behavioral change. Through Project Pressure he collaborates with world-renowned artists to create and exhibit provocative work that inspires climate action.

Thymann's artworks have been exhibited at Designmuseum Denmark, Horniman Museum London, Institute of Contemporary Art London, Natural History Museum Vienna, Museum of Climate Change Hong Kong and Moderna Museet Stockholm. His artwork is in permanent collection at the San Francisco Museum of Modern Art. Thymann is a Hasselblad Ambassador and has served on the board of organizations such The Design and Artists Copyright Society, UNICEF, Extinction Rebellion and Red Cross. His charitable work has been supported by the Queen of Denmark, Arts Council England, Danish Arts Foundation and Swiss Environmental Ministry. Thymann has also guest lectured at the Oxford University, The Photographers' Gallery, Central Saint Martins and University of the Arts London.

Projects and expeditions

Hybrids
In 2007, Thymann completed a four year documentation and published Hybrids, an art project featuring documentary photography with a global perspective exploring peculiar hybrid cultures around the planet, such as Snow Polo in St. Moritz, Gay Rodeo in Los Angeles, Underwater Striptease in Chile, Underground Gardening in Tokyo and more. Hybrids is a significant body of Thymann's art work between 2004 and 2008 and was exhibited in London, New York and Copenhagen.

Project Pressure
In 2008, Thymann founded Project Pressure, a global environmental charity dedicated to highlight the impact of climate change, inspiring action and participation. The charity is collaborating with artists creating and exhibiting work to engage emotions in order to incite positive behavioural change.

Rwenzori Mountains

In 2012, Thymann with his journalist colleague Ian Daly, and a team of nine local Ugandans spent 18 days detailing Rwenzori Mountains' glaciers from both sides of the range that lies on the equator. He has uncovered glaciers by trekking a new route into Congo and a applying historic maps onto a GPS device and Thymann's team traversed Congolese side of the range, where practically no one has been for decades because of insurgency and war. Thymann documented that glaciers have retreated massively on the east side of the mountains and the meltdown is super-intense with less than one kilometer square of ice remaining. Some geographers estimate that there will be no ice left within a decade.

Worlds clearest lake

Thymann is the only person to have conducted a scuba dive in the world's clearest lake, Blue Lake in New Zealand. In February 2013, he explored the underwater cave system of the Yucatán peninsula in order to take photographs, diving 1 km underwater to where salt and freshwater meet. The expedition was supported by New Zealand Department of Conservation and New Zealand Tourism and featured in The Guardian. In 2015, for the images taken during this expedition, Thymann received Honorable Mention at the International Photography Awards.

Kiruna

Starting in 2013, Thymann has documented the Arctic town of Kiruna in the Lapland region of Sweden creating and ongoing documentation of move of the town because of the unstable ground as a fissure caused by excessive iron ore. Thymann's expedition to Kiruna received coverage from Vice,  Bloomberg and CNN.

Glaciers documentation (Iran, Greenland and Ecuador)
Since 2008, Thymann has led expedition to detail the glaciers in remote regions to show that climate change is a global issue. He has led expeditions to Iceland, Norway, Switzerland, Sweden, United States, Argentina, Mexico, Chile, Spain, Uganda, Greenland, Iran, New Zealand, Nepal, Ecuador, Bolivia and Colombia. The expeditions were part of a mission by the charity Project Pressure to document the world’s vanishing and receding glaciers using art as inspiration for action.

Underwater cave exploration
Since 2016, Thymann is exploring underwater rivers on the Yucatán in Mexico. He wrote and directed a long-format documentary film of this form of environmental exploration, Flows, with music by Thom Yorke. By mapping underwater caves, areas that have been untouched by modern civilisation, he hopes to raise awareness of the natural and human heritage of this unique ecosystem that will hopefully result in greater protection. In 2018, The Guardian featured his work and in 2020, he created a short documentary for Red Bull. In 2022, Thymann discovered a new manatee habitat within the cenotes and documented the discovery with a 12-minute film that is available on the interactive streaming platform WaterBear.

Tonga Whales

In an expedition to the coast of Vava'u, Tonga in 2017, Thymann photographed the Tonga Whales for The New York Times Magazine. The series documents the pilot and humpback whales congregating in Tonga to raise their new-born calves.

Shroud

In an attempt to preserve an ice-grotto tourist attraction at the Rhône Glacier, local Swiss entrepreneurs wrapped a significant section of the ice-body in a thermal blanket. In early 2018, in their collaborative work, Simon Norfolk and Thymann address financial issues as driving forces behind human adaptation to the changing climate. The title Shroud refers to the melting glacier under its death cloak. In addition, a thermal image time-lapse film was created, showing how glaciers compare to the surrounding landscape by only reacting to long-term temperature changes, as opposed to weather fluctuations. The project was featured in New Scientist and the Los Angeles Times and is part of Project Pressure’s travelling exhibition MELTDOWN.

Nuclear wrecks in the Bikini Atolls

In 2019, Thymann dived the nuclear wrecks in the Bikini Atoll at 65 meters depth. In a mini documentary for CNN, Thymann travelled to the Marshall Islands to learn about the legacy of United States nuclear testing.

Voices For The Future

In 2019, Thymann-led global charity Project Pressure was responsible for the Voices For The Future, an art piece projected and transmitted on the UN building, featuring Swedish student activist Greta Thunberg in New York City in the lead-up to the 2019 UN Climate Action Summit. Thymann authored the messages of six young activists, including an authorized edit of Thunberg's words. The visualization was done by New Zealand-based artist Joseph Michael. Soundtracked by musician and artist Brian Eno, their commentary on the climate crisis (and the urgent actions that need to be taken to minimize its consequences).

Corals in Denmark
In 2020, Thymann led seafloor mapping project at Jammerbugt coast in Jutland, Denmark where he discovered an abundance of dead man’s fingers, the only soft coral found in Danish waters. Earlier, it was believed that the majority of the Jammerbugten’s seafloor was sandy with a low density of species, until Thymann found evidence of much greater biodiversity in a range seafloor habitats. This discovery by Thymann received wide coverage including that from The Guardian in July 2020.

References

External links
Official website

21st-century Danish photographers
Living people
Photographers from Copenhagen
20th-century Danish photographers
1974 births